List of parties in Ottoman Empire gives an overview of political parties in Ottoman Empire. Although the First Constitutional Era established the parliament in 1876 through the constitution, it was short-lived and did not involve political parties. The declaration of the Second Constitutional Era in 1908 was the first time political parties were allowed participation in the Ottoman government.

Second Constitutional Era parties (1908–1912) 
 Committee of Union and Progress (1889–1918)

 Private Enterprise and Decentralization Association (Teşebbüs-i Şahsi ve Adem-i Merkeziyet Cemiyeti; 1902–1908)
Ottoman Liberty Party (1908–1910)
 (Fedakâran-ı Millet Cemiyeti; 1908–09)
 (Fırka-i İbad or Osmanlı Demokrat Fırkası; 1909–11, founded by Ibrahim Temo, merged with the Freedom and Accord Party)
Ottoman Radical Reform Party (Islahat-ı Esasiye-ı Osmaniye Fırkası; 1909-1913, founded by Şerif Pasha, merged with the Freedom and Accord Party)
  (Heyet-i Müttefika-i Osmaniye, 1909)
Socialist Workers' Federation (1909–1916)
 (Mutedil Hürriyetperveran Fırkası, 1909–1911, merged with the Freedom and Accord Party)
Ottoman Socialist Party (1910–1913)
 People's Party (Ahali Fırkası, 1910, merged with the Freedom and Accord Party)
 (Hizb-i Cedid, 1911, merged with the Freedom and Accord Party)
Progress Party (Hizb-i Terakki, 1911, merged with the Freedom and Accord Party)
Freedom and Accord Party (1911–1919)
National Constitutional Party (Millî Meşrutiyet Fırkası, 1912)
The 1913 coup d'état and the aftermath of Mahmud Shevket Pasha's assassination meant the CUP took full control over Ottoman politics, effectively suspending the constitution and suppressing opposition parties. No political parties were founded between 1912 and 1918.

Armistice era parties (1918–1922) 
Renewal Party (1918–1919)
Ottoman Liberal People's Party (Osmanlı Hürriyetperver Avam Fırkası, 1918–20, continuation of the Committee of Union and Progress)
People's Economy Party (Ahali İktisat Fırkası, 1918)
Ottoman Salvation Party (Selamet-i Osmaniye Fırkası, 1918)
 Social Democrat Party (1918–1919)
National Liberty Party (Millî Ahrar Fırkası, 1919)
Turkish Workers and Peasants Socialist Party (1919–1920)
 (Milli Türk Fırkası, 1919)
Ottoman Working Party (Osmanlı Mesai Fırkası, 1919)
Ottoman Farmers Association Party (Osmanlı Çiftçiler Cemiyeti Fırkası, 1919)
Turkish Socialist Party (Türkiye Sosyalist Fırkası; 1919-22)
Association for Defence of National Rights (1918–1923/1927)
Labour Party (Amele Fırkası, 1920)
Communist Party of Turkey (1920–1988)
 (Türkiye Halk İştirakiyun Fırkası, 1920)
Turkish Agriculture Party (Türkiye Zürra Fırkası, 1920)
Turkish Communist Party (1920)
Independent Socialist Party (1922)

Ethnic parties 
 Bulgarian Constitutional Clubs (1908–1909)
 People's Federative Party (Bulgarian Section) (1909–1910)
 Armenakan Party (1885–1921)
 Social Democrat Hunchakian Party (1887–present)
 Armenian Revolutionary Federation (1890–present)
 Serb Democratic League (1908–1909)
 Al-Fatat (1908–1917)
 Ottoman Party for Administrative Decentralization (1913–1916)
 Jewish Social Democratic Labour Party in Palestine (Poale Zion) (1906–1915)

Political parties